Sigma Alpha Iota is a women's music fraternity. Formed to "uphold the highest standards of music" and "to further the development of music in America and throughout the world", it continues to provide musical and educational resources to its members and the general public.  Sigma Alpha Iota operates its own national philanthropy, Sigma Alpha Iota Philanthropies, Inc.  Sigma Alpha Iota is a member of the National Interfraternity Music Council and the Professional Fraternity Association.

History

Founding
Sigma Alpha Iota (Alpha Chapter) was founded on June 12, 1903 at the University School of Music in Ann Arbor, Michigan by seven women: Elizabeth A. Campbell, Frances Caspari, Minnie Davis Sherrill, Leila Farlin Laughlin, Nora Crane Hunt, Georgina Potts, and Mary Storrs Andersen.

The next chapter of the fraternity, Beta, was chartered in 1904 at Northwestern University in Evanston, Illinois. Chapters have now been chartered at over 300 universities, conservatories, and colleges.

Title IX and membership
Title IX of the Education Amendments of 1972, enacted on June 23, 1972, prohibits discrimination based on gender in educational programs receiving federal funding. This prohibition extends to professional societies for students enrolled at universities that receive federal funds for student financial aid or other programs. However, social organizations, such as social fraternities and sororities, are specifically exempted. In order to remain a fraternity of women, Sigma Alpha Iota petitioned for an exemption from Title IX from the U.S. Department of Education as a music fraternity that would initiate only women at the undergraduate level, and men and women at the professional level.  In 1981, the fraternity was officially granted exemption from Title IX by the DOE to remain single-sex as a social organization.  Sigma Alpha Iota International Music Fraternity remains a member of the Professional Fraternity Association.

SAI Philanthropies, Inc.
Created in 1974, Sigma Alpha Iota, Inc. is the charitable arm of the fraternity. Its mission is to "promote all aspects of music creation, performance and scholarship; and encourage service for and through music on the campus, in the community, in the nation, and throughout the world."   SAI Philanthropies, Inc. funds a wide range of projects.  This includes grants to individual SAI collegiate and alumnae chapters; grants for chapter-run community outreach programs; and grants, scholarships, loans, and awards to individual members.  It also funds the publication of Pan Pipes, the fraternity journal.

MacDowell, Pan's Cottage 

SAI Philanthropies also supports Pan's Cottage, a house at MacDowell, a retreat for Creative Artists in Peterborough, New Hampshire.  The cottage was donated by SAI in 1918 and houses artists in residence.  Pan's Cottage can accommodate up to 12 artists and is the largest residence at MacDowell.  SAI also provides continuing financial support to the cottage, including utilities, general repairs, and replacement of furnishings.  In 2018, members of SAI supported a $100,000 renovation project for Pan's Cottage.  SAI also supports the greater MacDowell mission, including a $75,000 donation in 2007 to restore and preserve Edward MacDowell's music room at Hillcrest Farm.

Inter-American Music Awards 
The Inter-American Music Awards is a triennial competition for young composers from North, Central, and
South America. The first award was presented in 1948. Selected by a panel of well-known composers, the winning composition is premiered at a Sigma Alpha Iota National Convention and is published by C. F. Peters Corporation under the direction of Sigma Alpha Iota. The composer receives a monetary prize and royalties are shared between the composer and Sigma Alpha Iota.

Support for musicians with special needs 
Since 1959 SAI Philanthropies, Inc. has assisted blind and musicians with visual impairments by contributing to the Braille Transcription Project and Bold Note Music Project, which help transcribe music into formats more easily accessible for the vision impaired.

People-to-People 
Since 1963, SAI's People-to-People project has provided material assistance (instruments and accessories,
scores, books, teaching materials) and encouragement to schools, music organizations, and musicians in
developing countries.  Musicians in more than 75 countries have received aid through this program.

Vision
“The VISION of Sigma Alpha Iota International Music Fraternity is to be recognized throughout the world as the foremost fraternity that

• Supports and encourages women musicians of all ages, races, and nationalities

• Supports and promotes successful and innovative educational programs in music for all stages of life

• Cultivates excellence in musical performance

• Promotes programs and activities that stress the love and importance of music in our lives

• Recognizes technological advances in the field of music

• Dedicates financial resources that ensure the continuation of programs necessary to support the objectives of the fraternity in perpetuity

• Has as its members people who exemplify professional and ethical behavior in the spirit of the Sigma Alpha Iota founders.”

Symphony (by Esther Requarth, Nu Chapter)

To study and practice the goodness of life, the beauty of art, the meaning of music.
To sing the song of sincerity and universal peace.
To speak the words that build, that bless and comfort.
To play the harpstrings of loving kindness, tolerance, appreciation, and genuine gratitude.
To strive for the joy of simplicity, for the noble, to be faithful over a few things
To listen, to be still and know the harmony from within.
To falter never in seeking loving service, wisdom, and understanding.
In a word, to be loyal to Sigma Alpha Iota and her teachings; to find joy, hope, inspiration; to remember that "every good gift and every perfect gift is from above" and "whatsoever ye do, do it heartily as to the Lord, and not unto men."
And again to practice.
This is to be our Symphony.

Famous members of SAI
Sigma Alpha Iota has been honored to welcome a multitude of artists from all walks of life, including musicians, teachers, composers, and conductors. Here are just a few of the many men and women who have been honored with Distinguished Membership by Sigma Alpha Iota:

Member Laureates
This category of Distinguished Membership given to "an initiated member of the Fraternity who has achieved international distinction in the music profession. She may be a performer, composer, teacher, author, musicologist or philanthropist."

Joyce Johnson (organist)
Libby Larsen (composer)
Jessye Norman (operatic soprano)
Dr. Loretta Long (Susan from Sesame Street)
Linda Robbins Coleman (composer)
Marilyn J Ziffrin (composer)
Katherine Hoover (composer/conductor/flutist)
 Florence Gillam Birdwell (voice/educator)
 Radie Britain (composer)
 Joan Wall (mezzo-soprano/educator)
 Dr. Dika Newlin (musicologist)
Sheila Johnson (violinist/co-founder of BET)

Initiated as collegiate sisters
Sheryl Crow (singer/songwriter)

Honorary Members
Honorary Members are women who have "achieved international distinction in the music profession who is [are] not an initiated member of Sigma Alpha Iota. She may be a performer, composer, teacher, author, musicologist, or philanthropist."

Marin Alsop (conductor)
Marian Anderson (contralto)
Martina Arroyo (soprano)
Rachel Barton Pine (violinist)
Nadia Boulanger (composer)
Jacqueline du Pré (cellist)
Gloria Estefan (singer) 
Renée Fleming (soprano)
Myra Hess (pianist)
Jennifer Higdon (composer)
Edith Killgore Kirkpatrick (music educator)
Ruth Laredo (pianist)
Anne-Sophie Mutter (violinist)
Marni Nixon (soprano, "The Voice of Hollywood")
Leontyne Price (soprano)
Joan Sutherland (soprano)
Dame Kiri Te Kanawa (soprano)
Denyce Graves (mezzo-soprano)
Deborah Voigt (soprano)
Beverly Sills (soprano)
Mimi Stillman (flutist)
Dolly Parton (singer/songwriter)
Kristin Chenoweth (singer/actress)
Dearbhail Finnegan(Irish Harpist)
Gertrude Price Wollner (composer)

National Arts Associates 
Distinguished membership given to "a man or woman who is nationally recognized for distinguished contribution to the arts."

 Wynton Marsalis (jazz trumpet)
 Dr. Keith Lockhart (conductor)
 Beegie Adair (jazz pianist)
 Robert Ward (composer)
 Dr. Samuel Adler (composer)
 Bradford Gowen (concert pianist/educator)
 Stanisław Skrowaczewski (conductor/composer)
 Dr. Horace Boyer (vocalist/educator/scholar)
 Pinchas Zukerman (violinist/violist/conductor)
 Paul Fritts (organ builder)
 Rayburn Wright (trombonist/composer/conductor)
 Marta Istomin (violinist/cellist/artistic director)

Patronesses

"A woman actively interested in community musical affairs, in the endeavors of the collegiate or alumnae chapter, and the purpose of the Fraternity, who has been invited by a collegiate or alumnae chapter to join SAI." Some famous patronesses:

Mamie Eisenhower (First Lady, 1953-1959)
Pat Nixon (First Lady, 1969-1974)
Bess Truman (First Lady, 1945-1953)

Chapters

Collegiate chapters 
 Alpha - University of Michigan, Ann Arbor, Michigan
 Alpha Alpha - Bethany College, Lindsborg, Kansas*
 Alpha Beta - University of Arizona, Tucson, Arizona
 Alpha Chi - Oklahoma College of Liberal Arts, Chickasha, Oklahoma**
 Alpha Delta - Wittenberg College, Springfield, Ohio*
 Alpha Epsilon - Columbia-Chicago, Chicago, Illinois (merged with Omega at Chicago Conservatory)*
 Alpha Eta - Oklahoma Baptist University, Shawnee, Oklahoma*
 Alpha Gamma - Muskingum College, New Concord, Ohio
 Alpha Iota - University of Oklahoma, Norman, Oklahoma
 Alpha Kappa - Pittsburg State University, Pittsburg, Kansas
 Alpha Lambda - Michigan State University, East Lansing, Michigan
 Alpha Mu - Carnegie Mellon University, Pittsburgh, Pennsylvania
 Alpha Nu - Youngstown State University, Youngstown, Ohio*
 Alpha Omega - University of Mississippi, Oxford, Mississippi
 Alpha Omicron - Occidental College, Los Angeles, California*
 Alpha Phi - University of Colorado, Boulder, Colorado*
 Alpha Pi - Fort Hays State University, Hays, Kansas*
 Alpha Psi - Texas Fine Arts, Texas**
 Alpha Rho - Our Lady of the Lake College, San Antonio, Texas**
 Alpha Sigma - University of New Mexico, Albuquerque, New Mexico*
 Alpha Tau - Carthage College, Kenosha, Wisconsin**
 Alpha Theta - Columbia University**
 Alpha Upsilon - University of Northern Iowa, Cedar Falls, Iowa
 Alpha Xi - Chicago Musical College, Chicago, Illinois**
 Alpha Zeta - Oklahoma City University, Oklahoma City, Oklahoma
 Beta - Northwestern University, Evanston, Illinois
 Beta Alpha - Florida State University, Tallahassee, Florida
 Beta Beta - University of Kansas, Lawrence, Kansas
 Beta Chi - McNeese State University, Lake Charles, Louisiana
 Beta Delta - University of Puget Sound, Tacoma, Washington
 Beta Epsilon - University of Evansville, Evansville, Indiana
 Beta Eta - Western Michigan University, Kalamazoo, Michigan
 Beta Gamma - Bradley University, Peoria, Illinois
 Beta Iota - Northwestern State University, Natchitoches, Louisiana
 Beta Kappa - Texas Wesleyan University, Fort Worth, Texas*
 Beta Lambda - Valparaiso University, Valparaiso, Indiana
 Beta Mu - Northern Illinois University, DeKalb, Illinois*
 Beta Nu - Immaculate Heart College, Los Angeles, California**
 Beta Omega - Mount St. Mary's College, Los Angeles, California**
 Beta Omicron - Hartwick College, Oneonta, New York
 Beta Phi - The Catholic University of America, Washington, DC*
 Beta Pi - University of Houston, Houston, Texas
 Beta Psi - East Carolina University, Greenville, North Carolina
 Beta Rho - Georgia College & State University, Milledgeville, Georgia
 Beta Sigma - University of Tampa, Tampa, Florida
 Beta Tau - New York University, New York, New York*
 Beta Theta - Sam Houston State University, Huntsville, Texas
 Beta Upsilon - California State University, Los Angeles, California*
 Beta Xi - University of Texas, Austin, Texas
 Beta Zeta - Meredith College, Raleigh, NC*
 Chi - Macalester College, St. Paul, Minnesota**
 Delta - Detroit Conservatory, Detroit, Michigan**
 Delta Alpha - Lebanon Valley College, Annville, Pennsylvania
 Delta Beta - University of Memphis, Memphis, Tennessee
 Delta Chi - University of South Florida, Tampa, Florida
 Delta Delta - Montclair State University, Upper Montclair, New Jersey
 Delta Epsilon - Southeast Missouri State University, Cape Girardeau, Missouri
 Delta Eta - Northern Arizona University, Flagstaff, Arizona
 Delta Gamma - University of Florida, Gainesville, Florida
 Delta Iota - University of Central Oklahoma, Edmond, Oklahoma
 Delta Kappa - Minot State University, Minot, North Dakota*
 Delta Lambda - State University College, Fredonia, New York
 Delta Mu -  Temple University, Philadelphia, Pennsylvania
 Delta Nu - Howard University, Washington, DC
 Delta Omega - University of Kentucky, Lexington, Kentucky
 Delta Phi - Mansfield University, Mansfield, Pennsylvania
 Delta Pi - Austin Peay State University, Clarksville, Tennessee
 Delta Psi - Lincoln University*
 Delta Rho - North Central College, Naperville, Illinois**
 Delta Sigma - University of Dayton, Dayton, Ohio
 Delta Tau - Augustana College, Rock Island, Illinois
 Delta Theta - Minnesota State University, Mankato, Mankato, Minnesota*
 Delta Upsilon - Union College**
 Delta Xi - Pacific University, Forest Grove, Oregon**
 Delta Zeta - Troy University, Troy, Alabama
 Epsilon - Ithaca College, Ithaca, New York
 Epsilon Alpha - University of Texas, El Paso, Texas
 Epsilon Beta - Gettysburg College, Gettysburg, Pennsylvania
 Epsilon Chi - Mississippi State University, Mississippi State, Mississippi
 Epsilon Delta - Ouachita Baptist University, Arkadelphia, Arkansas
 Epsilon Epsilon - West Chester University, West Chester, Pennsylvania
 Epsilon Eta - Eastern Illinois University, Charleston, Illinois*
 Epsilon Gamma - Arkansas State University, State University, Arkansas
 Epsilon Iota - University of Tennessee, Martin, Tennessee
 Epsilon Kappa - Louisiana Tech University, Ruston, Louisiana
 Epsilon Lambda - Belmont University, Nashville, Tennessee
 Epsilon Mu - Northern Michigan University, Marquette, Michigan*
 Epsilon Nu - University of Hawaii at Manoa, Honolulu, Hawaii**
 Epsilon Omega - University of Central Missouri, Warrensburg, Missouri
 Epsilon Omicron - University of Wisconsin, Eau Claire, Wisconsin
 Epsilon Phi - Northwest Missouri State University, Maryville, Missouri
 Epsilon Pi - Northeast Missouri State University/Truman State University, Kirksville, Missouri
 Epsilon Psi - Fairmont State University, Fairmont, West Virginia*
 Epsilon Rho - Northeastern Illinois University, Chicago, Illinois*
 Epsilon Sigma - Colorado Women's College, Denver, Colorado**
 Epsilon Tau - University of Arkansas, Little Rock, Arkansas*
 Epsilon Theta - Appalachian State University, Boone, North Carolina
 Epsilon Upsilon - Adrian College, Adrian, Michigan*
 Epsilon Xi - St. Cloud State University, St. Cloud, Minnesota*
 Epsilon Zeta - Boston Conservatory, Boston, Massachusetts*
 Eta - College of Music, Cincinnati, Ohio (merged with Iota, 1955)**
 Eta Alpha - Mt. Scenario College*
 Eta Beta - University of North Carolina at Pembroke
 Eta Chi - Southern Illinois University, Edwardsville, Illinois*
 Eta Delta - Kennesaw State University, Kennesaw, Georgia
 Eta Epsilon - Missouri Western State University, St. Joseph, Missouri
 Eta Eta - East Texas Baptist University, Marshall, Texas*
 Eta Gamma - University of West Georgia, Carrollton, Georgia*
 Eta-Iota - University of Cincinnati, Cincinnati, Ohio
 Eta Kappa - University of Colorado at Denver, Metropolitan College, Denver, Colorado*
 Eta Lambda - Centenary College of Louisiana, Shreveport, Louisiana
 Eta Mu - University of Hartford, West Hartford, Connecticut
 Eta Nu - Hastings College, Hastings, Nebraska
 Eta Omega - University of the Pacific, Stockton, California
 Eta Omicron - University of Nevada, Reno, Nevada
 Eta Phi - Pennsylvania State University, University Park, Pennsylvania*
 Eta Pi - Stetson University, DeLand, Florida
 Eta Psi - Northern Kentucky University, Highland Heights, Kentucky
 Eta Rho - University of Delaware, Newark, Delaware
 Eta Sigma - Eastern Kentucky University, Richmond, Kentucky
 Eta Tau - Shepherd University, Shepherdstown, West Virginia
 Eta Theta - Western Carolina University, Cullowhee, North Carolina
 Eta Upsilon - Radford University, Radford, Virginia
 Eta Xi - Central Michigan University, Mt. Pleasant, Michigan
 Eta Zeta - Grambling State University, Grambling, Louisiana
 Gamma - American University, Chicago**
 Gamma Alpha - Boston University, Boston, Massachusetts*
 Gamma Beta - Stanford University, Stanford, California*
 Gamma Chi - California State University, Northridge, California*
 Gamma Delta - State University of New York, Potsdam, New York
 Gamma Epsilon - University of Maryland, College Park, Maryland
 Gamma Eta - Agnes Scott College, Decatur, Georgia
 Gamma Gamma - Shenandoah University, Winchester, Virginia
 Gamma Iota - James Madison University, Harrisonburg, Virginia
 Gamma Kappa - Longwood University, Farmville, Virginia
 Gamma Lambda - Wesleyan College, Macon, Georgia*
 Gamma Mu - Arizona State University, Tempe, Arizona
 Gamma Nu - Eastern New Mexico University, Portales, New Mexico*
 Gamma Omega - Webster University, St. Louis, Missouri*
 Gamma Omicron - Bowling Green State University, Bowling Green, Ohio
 Gamma Phi - Hardin-Simmons University, Abilene, Texas*
 Gamma Pi - California State University, Long Beach, California
 Gamma Psi - William Jewell College, Liberty, Missouri*
 Gamma Rho - University of Tennessee–Knoxville
 Gamma Sigma - Union University, Jackson, Tennessee*
 Gamma Tau - Northern State University, Aberdeen, South Dakota
 Gamma Theta - Georgia Southern University, Statesboro, Georgia
 Gamma Upsilon - Morehead State University, Morehead, Kentucky
 Gamma Xi - Moorhead State University, Moorhead, Minnesota*
 Gamma Zeta - Old Dominion University, Norfolk, Virginia
 Iota - Conservatory of Music, Cincinnati, Ohio (merged with Eta, 1955, to become Eta-Iota)
 Iota Alpha - Oklahoma State University, Stillwater, Oklahoma
 Iota Beta - Murray State University, Murray, Kentucky
 Iota Chi - Ball State University, Muncie, Indiana
 Iota Delta - San Diego State University, San Diego, California*
 Iota Epsilon - Indiana University, Bloomington, Indiana*
 Iota Eta - Indiana State University, Terre Haute, Indiana
 Iota Gamma - Emporia State University, Emporia, Kansas*
 Iota Kappa - Mississippi University for Women, Columbus, Mississippi**
 Iota Lambda - University of Missouri, Columbia, Missouri
 Iota Mu - Drury College, Springfield, Missouri*
 Iota Nu - Seton Hill College, Greensburg, Pennsylvania**
 Iota Omega - Texas Woman's University, Denton, Texas
 Iota Omicron - University of Southwestern Louisiana, Lafayette, Louisiana
 Iota Phi - Vanderbilt University, Nashville, Tennessee*
 Iota Pi - Albion College, Albion, Michigan
 Iota Psi - University of Minnesota, Duluth, Minnesota*
 Iota Rho - Mary Hardin Baylor College, Belton, Texas*
 Iota Sigma - University of Kansas City, Kansas City, KS (merged with Tau, 1959, became Tau-Sigma)
 Iota Tau - University of North Carolina, Chapel Hill, North Carolina
 Iota Theta - University of North Texas, Denton, Texas
 Iota Upsilon - Benedictine College, Atchison, Kansas*
 Iota Xi - Chicago YMCA**
 Iota Zeta - University of Georgia, Athens, Georgia
 Kappa - University of Nebraska, Lincoln, Nebraska
 Kappa Alpha - Rowan University, Glassboro, New Jersey
 Kappa Beta - Indiana University of Pennsylvania, Indiana, Pennsylvania
 Kappa Chi - University of Alabama–Birmingham
 Kappa Delta - Clark Atlanta University, Atlanta, Georgia*
 Kappa Epsilon - University of Southern Mississippi, Hattiesburg, Mississippi
 Kappa Eta - Clarion University of Pennsylvania, Clarion, Pennsylvania*
 Kappa Gamma - University of North Carolina at Greensboro, Greensboro, North Carolina
 Kappa Iota - Tennessee State University, Nashville, Tennessee
 Kappa Kappa - Southern University and A&M College, Baton Rouge, Louisiana
 Kappa Lambda - West Virginia University, Morgantown, West Virginia
 Kappa Mu - Alabama State University, Montgomery, Alabama
 Kappa Nu - Lindenwood University, St. Charles, Missouri
 Kappa Omega - Elmhurst College, Elmhurst, Illinois*
 Kappa Omicron - Texas Southern University, Houston*
 Kappa Phi - Auburn University, Alabama
 Kappa Pi - Middle Tennessee State University, Murfreesboro, Tennessee*
 Kappa Psi - California State University - Fresno
 Kappa Rho - Langston University, Langston Oklahoma
 Kappa Sigma - Saint Mary's University of Minnesota, Winona, Minnesota
 Kappa Tau - Capital University, Columbus, Ohio
 Kappa Theta - University of Nevada, Las Vegas, Las Vegas, Nevada*
 Kappa Upsilon - Kansas State University, Manhattan, Kansas
 Kappa Xi - Morgan State University, Baltimore, Maryland*
 Kappa Zeta - New Mexico State University, Las Cruces, New Mexico*
 Lambda - New England Conservatory, Boston, Massachusetts*
 Lambda Alpha - East Tennessee State University - Johnson City, Tennessee*
 Lambda Beta - Mars Hill College, Mars Hill, North Carolina
 Lambda Chi - California State University-Fullerton
 Lambda Delta - VanderCook College of Music, Chicago, Illinois
 Lambda Epsilon - Howard Payne University, Brownwood, Texas*
 Lambda Eta - Lee University, Cleveland, Tennessee*
 Lambda Gamma - Texas A&M University at Corpus Christi, Texas
 Lambda Iota - Rollins College, Winter Park, Florida
 Lambda Kappa - Alderson-Broaddus College, Phillippi, West Virginia*
 Lambda Lambda - Texas A&M University-Kingsville
 Lambda Mu - Illinois State University
 Lambda Nu - University of Arkansas-Pine Bluff
 Lambda Omega - North Carolina Central University*
 Lambda Omicron - Florida International University
 Lamba Pi - Florida Atlantic University
 Lambda Phi - University of Massachusetts, Amherst, Massachusetts
 Lambda Psi - University of North Alabama, Florence, Alabama
 Lambda Rho - Norfolk State University, Virginia*
 Lambda Sigma - Columbus State University Schwob School of Music*
 Lambda Tau - Westminster Choir College at Rider University
 Lambda Theta - Frostburg State University, Frostburg, Maryland*
 Lambda Upsilon - Miami University, Ohio
 Lambda Xi - South Carolina State University
 Lambda Zeta - Prairie View A&M University, Prairie View, Texas
 Mu - University of North Dakota, Grand Forks, North Dakota*
 Mu Alpha - Grand Valley State University
 Mu Beta - Virginia State University
 Mu Chi - Ohio Northern University, Ada, Ohio
 Mu Delta - University of Toledo
 Mu Epsilon - George Mason University
 Mu Eta  - University of Montevallo,  Montevallo, AL
 Mu Gamma - Hampton University, Hampton, VA
 Mu Iota - Western Kentucky University, Bowling Green, KY
 Mu Kappa - Western Illinois University, Macomb, IL 
 Mu Lambda - Wingate University, Wingate, NC
 Mu Mu - Henderson State University, Arkadelphia, AR
 Mu Nu - Winthrop University, Rock Hill, SC
 Mu Omicron - Bethel University, McKenzie, TN
 Mu Pi - Fisk University, Nashville, TN*
 Mu Psi - University of North Carolina, Charlotte, Charlotte, NC
 Mu Rho - Southeastern Louisiana University, Hammond, Louisiana
 Mu Sigma - Lincoln University of Pennsylvania, Lincoln U, PA
 Mu Tau - Colorado State University, Fort Collins, CO
 Mu Zeta - Kutztown University, Kutztown, PA
 Mu Theta - Texas A&M University - Commerce, Commerce, TX
 Mu Tau - Colorado State University, Fort Collins, CO
 Mu Upsilon - Jackson State University, Jackson, MS
 Mu Xi - Chicago College of Performing Arts, Chicago, IL*
 Nu - Millikin University, Decatur, Illinois
 Nu Alpha - The College of New Jersey, Ewing, NJ
 Nu Beta - Southwestern Oklahoma State University, Weatherford, OK
 Nu Delta- Towson University, Towson, Maryland
 Nu Gamma - Stephen F. Austin State University, Nacogdoches, Texas
 Nu Zeta - Oakland University, Rochester, MI
 Omega - Chicago Conservatory, Chicago, Illinois*
 Omicron - North Dakota State University, Fargo, North Dakota
 Phi - MacPhail College, Minneapolis, Minnesota**
 Pi - Drake University, Des Moines, Iowa
 Psi - Knox College, Galesburg, Illinois
 Rho - University of Wisconsin-Madison, Wisconsin
 Sigma - Wayne State University, Detroit, Michigan**
 Sigma Alpha - Illinois Wesleyan University, Bloomington, Illinois
 Sigma Alpha Iota - Central Methodist University, Fayette, Missouri
 Sigma Beta - Ohio University, Athens, Ohio
 Sigma Chi - University of Miami, Coral Gables, Florida
 Sigma Delta - University of Illinois, Urbana-Champaign, Illinois
 Sigma Epsilon - Wisconsin Conservatory**
 Sigma Eta - University of Redlands, Redlands, California
 Sigma Gamma - University of Tulsa, Tulsa, Oklahoma
 Sigma Iota - Syracuse University, Syracuse, New York
 Sigma Kappa - University of Wyoming**
 Sigma Lambda - Iowa State University, Ames, Iowa
 Sigma Mu - Hillsdale College, Hillsdale, Michigan
 Sigma Nu - Louisville Conservatory of Music, Louisville, Kentucky**
 Sigma Omega - Susquehanna University, Selinsgrove, Pennsylvania
 Sigma Omicron - University of Arkansas, Fayetteville, Arkansas
 Sigma Phi - Louisiana State University, Baton Rouge, Louisiana
 Sigma Pi - MacMurray College, Jacksonville, Illinois**
 Sigma Psi - Beloit College, Beloit, Wisconsin**
 Sigma Rho - Montana State University, Bozeman, Montana**
 Sigma Sigma - University of Minnesota, Minneapolis, Minnesota*
 Sigma Tau - University of Southern California, Los Angeles, California*
 Sigma Theta - Eastman School of Music, Rochester, New York
 Sigma Upsilon - University of Denver, Denver, Colorado
 Sigma Xi - University of California, Los Angeles, California*
 Sigma Zeta - University of Idaho, Moscow, Idaho
 Tau-Sigma - Conservatory of Music / University of Missouri, Kansas City, Missouri (merged 1959)*
 Theta - Washburn University, Topeka, Kansas
 Theta Alpha - Ohio State University, Columbus, Ohio
 Theta Beta - Jacksonville State University, Jacksonville, Alabama
 Theta Chi - University of South Carolina, Columbia, South Carolina
 Theta Delta - University of Alabama, Tuscaloosa, Alabama
 Theta Epsilon - California State University, Stanislaus, California
 Theta Eta - Alma College, Alma, Michigan
 Theta Gamma - University of Texas, San Antonio, Texas
 Theta Iota - University of Wisconsin, Platteville, Wisconsin
 Theta Kappa - William Paterson University, Wayne, New Jersey
 Theta Lambda - Furman University, Greenville, South Carolina
 Theta Mu - University of Tennessee, Chattanooga, Tennessee*
 Theta Nu - Florida A&M University, Tallahassee, Florida
 Theta Omega - Texas State University-San Marcos
 Theta Omicron - Central Methodist University, Fayette, Missouri
 Theta Phi - University of North Florida, Jacksonville, Florida*
 Theta Pi - Christopher Newport University, Newport News, Virginia
 Theta Psi - Loyola University-New Orleans, Louisiana
 Theta Rho - Missouri State University, Springfield, Missouri**
 Theta Sigma - Clayton College and State University, Morrow, Georgia*
 Theta Tau - Southern Illinois University at Carbondale, Illinois
 Theta Theta - Nicholls State University, Thibodaux, Louisiana
 Theta Upsilon - New Jersey City University, Jersey City, New Jersey
 Theta Xi - Bethune-Cookman University, Daytona Beach, Florida
 Theta Zeta - Alabama A & M University, Normal, Alabama
 Upsilon - Nebraska Wesleyan College**
 Xi - Lawrence University, Appleton, Wisconsin
 Zeta - Jordan Conservatory, Butler University, Indianapolis, Indiana
 Zeta Alpha - Wichita State University, Wichita, Kansas*
 Zeta Beta - Wayland Baptist University, Plainview, Texas*
 Zeta Chi - University of Central Arkansas, Conway, Arkansas
 Zeta Delta - Houston Baptist University, Houston, Texas*
 Zeta Epsilon - University of Iowa, Iowa City, Iowa
 Zeta Eta - West Virginia Wesleyan College, Buckhannon, West Virginia
 Zeta Gamma - University of South Alabama, Mobile, Alabama
 Zeta Iota - Wright State University, Dayton, Ohio*
 Zeta Kappa - Southern Oregon University*
 Zeta Lambda - Southern Arkansas University, Magnolia, Arkansas*
 Zeta Mu - Western Connecticut State University, Danbury, Connecticut**
 Zeta Nu - University of Texas, Arlington, Texas
 Zeta Omega - Limestone College, Limestone, South Carolina**
 Zeta Omicron - Lipscomb University, Nashville, Tennessee*
 Zeta Phi - Spelman College, Atlanta, Georgia*
 Zeta Pi - Central Connecticut State University, New Britain, Connecticut**
 Zeta Psi - Indiana University - Purdue University, Fort Wayne, Indiana
 Zeta Rho - Arkansas Tech University, Russellville, Arkansas
 Zeta Sigma - Angelo State University, San Angelo, Texas*
 Zeta Tau - University of Central Florida, Orlando, Florida
 Zeta Theta - Valdosta State University, Valdosta, Georgia
 Zeta Upsilon - Edinboro University of Pennsylvania, Edinboro, Pennsylvania*
 Zeta Xi - Berry College, Mount Berry, Georgia*
 Zeta Zeta - Kean University, Union, New Jersey*

(* Inactive Chapter, ** Closed Chapter)

Alumnae chapters 
 Aberdeen Alumnae  - Aberdeen, South Dakota
 Abilene Alumnae - Abilene, Texas*
 Albuquerque Alumnae - Albuquerque, New Mexico*
 Ann Arbor Alumnae - Ann Arbor, Michigan
 Arlington Alumnae - Arlington, Texas
 Atlanta Alumnae - Atlanta, Georgia
 Austin Alumnae - Austin, Texas
 Baltimore Alumnae  - Baltimore, Maryland
 Baton Rouge Alumnae - Baton Rouge, Louisiana*
 Bloomington Alumnae - Bloomington, Indiana
 Bloomington/Normal Alumnae - Bloomington/Normal, Illinois
 Boston Alumnae - Boston, Massachusetts
 Boulder Alumnae - Boulder, Colorado
 Buffalo Alumnae - Buffalo, New York
 Central New Jersey Alumnae - Central New Jersey
 Charleston Alumnae - Charleston, Illinois*
 Charlotte Alumnae - Charlotte, North Carolina
 Chicago Alumnae - Chicago, Illinois
 Cincinnati Alumnae - Cincinnati, Ohio
 Clarksville Alumnae - Clarksville, Tennessee
 Cleveland Alumnae - Cleveland, Ohio
 Colorado Springs Alumnae - Colorado Springs, Colorado
 Columbia Alumnae - Columbia, Missouri
 Columbus Alumnae - Columbus, Ohio
 Covina Alumnae - Covina, California*
 Dallas Alumnae  - Dallas, Texas
 Dayton Alumnae - Dayton, Ohio
 Decatur Alumnae - Decatur, Illinois
 Denton Alumnae - Denton, Texas
 Denver Alumnae - Denver, Colorado
 Des Moines Alumnae - Des Moines, Iowa
 Detroit Alumnae - Detroit, Michigan
 East Bay Alumnae  - East Bay, California
 East Texas Alumnae - East Texas
 Edmond Alumnae - Edmond, Oklahoma
 Edwardsville Alumnae - Edwardsville, Illinois*
 El Paso Alumnae - El Paso, Texas*
 Emporia Alumnae - Emporia, Kansas*
 Evanston Alumnae - Evanston, Illinois
 Evansville Alumnae - Evansville, Indiana
 Fargo-Moorhead Alumnae  - Fargo-Moorhead, North Dakota
 Fayetteville Alumnae - Fayetteville, Arkansas
 Flagstaff Alumnae - Flagstaff, Arizona*
 Flint Alumnae - Flint, Michigan*
 Fort Lauderdale Alumnae - Fort Lauderdale, Florida
 Fort Wayne Alumnae - Fort Wayne, Indiana
 Fort Worth Alumnae - Fort Worth, Texas
 Gainesville Alumnae  - Gainesville, Florida
 Galesburg Alumnae - Galesburg, Illinois*
 Grand Forks Alumnae - Grand Forks, North Dakota*
 Grand Rapids Alumnae - Grand Rapids, Michigan
 Greater Boone Alumnae - Boone, North Carolina*
 Greater Hartford - Hartford, Connecticut*
 Grosse Pointe Alumnae - Grosse Pointe, Michigan*
 Hampton Roads Alumnae - Hampton Roads, Virginia
 Harrisburg Alumnae - Harrisburg, Pennsylvania*
 Hawaii Alumnae - Hawaii*
 Hays Alumnae - Hays, Kansas*
 Hollywood Alumnae - Hollywood, California*
 Hot Springs Alumnae - Hot Springs, Arkansas
 Houston Alumnae - Houston, Texas
 Houston Bay Area Alumnae - Houston Bay, Texas*
 Indianapolis Alumnae - Indianapolis, Indiana
 Iowa City Alumnae - Iowa City, Iowa
 Ithaca Alumnae - Ithaca, New York*
 Jackson Alumnae - Jackson, Tennessee
 Jacksonville Alumnae - Jacksonville, Florida*
 Jonesboro Alumnae - Jonesboro, Arkansas
 Kalamazoo Alumnae - Kalamazoo, Michigan
 Kansas City Missouri Alumnae - Kansas City, Missouri
 Kirksville Alumnae - Kirksville, Missouri*
 Knoxville Alumnae - Knoxville, Tennessee
 Lafayette Alumnae - Lafayette, Louisiana
 LaGrange Alumnae - LaGrange, Illinois*
 Lake Charles Alumnae - Lake Charles, Louisiana*
 Lake County Alumnae - Lake County, Indiana
 Lansing/East Lansing Alumnae - Lansing/East Lansing, Michigan
 Las Vegas Alumnae - Las Vegas, Nevada
 Lawrence Alumnae - Lawrence, Kansas
 Lexington Alumnae - Lexington, Kentucky
 Liberty Alumnae - Liberty, Missouri*
 Lincoln Alumnae - Lincoln, Nebraska
 Lindsborg Alumnae - Lindsborg, Kansas
 Little Rock Alumnae - Little Rock, Arkansas*
 Long Beach Alumnae - Long Beach, California
 Los Angeles Alumnae - Los Angeles, California*
 Louisville Alumnae - Louisville, Kentucky
 Madison Alumnae  - Madison, Wisconsin
 Melbourne-Vero Beach Alumnae - Melbourne, Florida*
 Memphis Alumnae - Memphis, Tennessee
 Miami Alumnae - Miami, Florida
 Midland Alumnae - Midland, Michigan
 Milwaukee Alumnae - Milwaukee, Wisconsin
 Minneapolis/St. Paul Alumnae - Minneapolis/St. Paul, Minnesota
 Minot Alumnae - Minot, North Dakota*
 Mobile Alumnae - Mobile, Alabama
 Moorhead Alumnae - Morehead, Minnesota*
 Moscow-Pullman Alumnae - Moscow-Pullman, Idaho
 Muncie Alumnae - Muncie, Indiana
 Murray Alumnae - Murray, Kentucky*
 Nashville Alumnae - Nashville, Tennessee
 New Orleans Alumnae - New Orleans, Louisiana
 New York City Alumnae - New York, New York
 Norfolk Alumnae - Norfolk, Virginia*
 Norman Alumnae - Norman, Oklahoma*
 Northern Delaware - Wilmington, Delaware
 Northern New Jersey Alumnae - Northern New Jersey
 Northwest Georgia Alumnae - Northwest Georgia*
 Northwest Ohio Alumnae - Northwest Ohio
 Oak Park Alumnae  - Oak Park, Illinois
 Oklahoma City Alumnae - Oklahoma City, Oklahoma
 Omaha Alumnae - Omaha, Nebraska*
 Orange County Alumnae - Orange County, California
 Orlando Alumnae - Orlando, Florida
 Park Ridge Alumnae  - Park Ridge, Illinois*
 Pasadena Alumnae - Pasadena, California
 Peoria Alumnae - Peoria, Illinois
 Philadelphia Alumnae - Philadelphia, Pennsylvania
 Phoenix Alumnae - Phoenix, Arizona
 Pittsburg Alumnae - Pittsburg, Kansas*
 Pittsburgh Alumnae - Pittsburgh, Pennsylvania
 Pontchartrain Alumnae - Pontchartrain, Michigan
 Portland Alumnae - Portland, Oregon*
 Quad Cities - Quad Cities, Iowa*
 Raleigh/Durham Alumnae - Raleigh/Durham, North Carolina
 Reno Alumnae - Reno, Nevada
 Richmond Alumnae - Richmond, Virginia
 Riverside-San Bernardino Alumnae - Riverside-San Bernardino, California
 Rochester Alumnae - Rochester, New York
 Rockford Alumnae - Rockford, Illinois
 Sacramento Alumnae - Sacramento, California*
 Salisbury Alumnae  - Salisbury, Maryland*
 San Antonio Alumnae - San Antonio, Texas
 San Diego County Alumnae - San Diego County, California
 San Fernando Valley Alumnae - San Fernando, California*
 San Francisco Peninsula Alumnae - San Francisco, California
 Santa Clara Valley Alumnae - Santa Clara, California*
 Sarasota-Manatee Alumnae - Sarasota-Manatee, Florida
 Savannah Alumnae - Savannah, Georgia*
 Seattle Alumnae - Seattle, Washington
 Selinsgrove Alumnae - Selinsgrove, Pennsylvania
 South Carolina Alumnae - South Carolina*
 South Georgia Alumnae - South Georgia
 Spokane Alumnae - Spokane, Washington*
 Springfield Alumnae - Springfield, Missouri
 Springfield Alumnae - Springfield, Ohio*
 Stanislaus County Alumnae - Stanislaus County, California*
 Statesboro Alumnae - Statesboro, Georgia
 St. Cloud Alumnae - St. Cloud, Minnesota*
 St. Louis Alumnae - St. Louis, Missouri
 St. Petersburg Alumnae - St. Petersburg, Florida*
 Syracuse Alumnae - Syracuse, New York*
 Tacoma Alumnae  - Tacoma, Washington
 Tallahassee Alumnae - Tallahassee, Florida
 Tampa Alumnae - Tampa, Florida
 Terre Haute Alumnae - Terre Haute, Indiana
 Topeka Alumnae - Topeka, Kansas
 Tri-Cities Alumnae - Tri-Cities, New York*
 Tucson Alumnae - Tucson, Arizona
 Tulsa Alumnae - Tulsa, Oklahoma
 Urbana Alumnae - Urbana, Illinois
 Volusia County Alumnae - Volusia County, Florida
 Warren-Youngstown Alumnae - Warren-Youngstown, Ohio
 Washington, DC Alumnae - Washington, DC
 Waterloo Alumnae - Waterloo, Iowa*
 West Tennessee Alumnae - Jackson, Tennessee*
 West Valley Satellite Branch - Phoenix, Arizona*
 Whittier Alumnae - Whittier, California*
 Wichita Alumnae - Wichita, Kansas
 Winchester Alumnae - Winchester, Virginia

(* Inactive Chapter, ** Closed Chapter)

See also

 Professional fraternities and sororities

References

 
1903 establishments in Michigan
Music organizations based in the United States
National Interfraternity Music Council
Student organizations established in 1903
Professional Fraternity Association